The 1926 Cambridge University by-election was held on 13 February 1926.  The by-election was held due to the death of the incumbent Conservative MP, John Rawlinson.  It was won by the Conservative candidate John James Withers, who was unopposed.

References

Cambridge University by-election
Cambridge University by-election
Cambridge University by-election
By-elections to the Parliament of the United Kingdom in Cambridge University
20th century in Cambridge
Unopposed by-elections to the Parliament of the United Kingdom (need citation)